The Lion is the debut EP from American rock trio band Wild Adriatic released in 2011. At the time, the band consisted of four members.

Track listing
All songs written by Wild Adriatic.

Credits
Wild Adriatic
 Travis Gray - vocals, lead guitar
 Shane Gilman - rhythm guitar
 Rich Derbyshire - bass
 Mateo Vosganian - drums

References

2011 EPs
Wild Adriatic albums